Total TV is a 24-hour Hindi news television channel owned by the Total TELEFILMS Pvt. Ltd. Head office and studio is situated at Noida.

Hindi-language television channels in India
Agriculture in India
24-hour television news channels in India
Television channels and stations established in 2007
2007 establishments in India